This page documents the tornadoes and tornado outbreaks of 1993, primarily in the United States. Most tornadoes form in the U.S., although some events may take place internationally. Tornado statistics for older years like this often appear significantly lower than modern years due to fewer reports or confirmed tornadoes, however by the 1990s tornado statistics were coming closer to the numbers we see today.

Synopsis

Like 1992, the 1993 tornado season was unusually late. While April and May saw less activity than normal, June again was very busy with 313 tornadoes and July saw 242. Fall was very quiet and saw no large outbreaks. 1993 was also the first year since 1989 to be without an F5 tornado.

Events

Confirmed tornado total for the entire year 1993 in the United States.

January
There were 17 tornadoes confirmed in the US in January.

February
There were 78 tornadoes confirmed in the US in February.

February 21–23
A severe weather outbreak in the Southeastern United States produced 24 tornadoes rated as high as F3. A particularly destructive tornado struck the community of Lenoir City, Tennessee. Multiple buildings and businesses were destroyed resulting in damages more than $2 million. The line of severe thunderstorms also blasted the area with marble-sized hail and left 7,000 residents without power into much of the night.

March
There were 48 tornadoes confirmed in the US in March.

March 12

Five people were killed in Florida by three separate tornadoes spawned by a major derecho with embedded supercells. This derecho was the southern edge of the 1993 Storm of the Century.

April
There were 85 tornadoes confirmed in the US in April.

April 8

Two weak F1 tornadoes touched down in South Texas during the early morning hours of April 8. That afternoon, a strong waterspout moved ashore and struck Grand Isle, Louisiana as a devastating F2 tornado. A wood frame high school and a post office were destroyed, and many homes, mobile homes, apartments, and businesses were also damaged or destroyed. A female high school senior was killed on the second school floor of the destroyed high school while two construction workers were killed on the first floor of a home they were remodeling near the high school. Along with the fatalities, 39 other people were injured. The tornado then crossed over the Caminada Bay and moved into Cheniere Caminada before dissipating.

April 24
Seven people were killed and 100 injured by an F4 tornado in Catoosa, Oklahoma. Those seven fatalities were the most by any one tornado in 1993. The tornado damaged or destroyed 75% of the town's businesses.

May
There were 177 tornadoes confirmed in the US in May.

May 7
46 tornadoes in the Midwest resulted in one fatality from an F4 tornado in Kansas.

June
There were 313 tornadoes confirmed in the US in June.

June 7–9

A prolific early-summer tornado outbreak took place between June 7–9, mainly in the northern Great Plains and Upper Midwest states. On June 7, 41 tornadoes were confirmed. South Dakota was the hardest hit, with two F4 tornadoes confirmed in the eastern part of the state. One of the F4 tornadoes tracked for  miles, beginning just west of Lyons, and ending just south of Astoria, crossing Interstate 29 in its path. On June 8, 57 tornadoes were confirmed. While most tornadoes did stay around the Upper Midwest, the highest rated tornado that day was an F3 tornado which occurred north of Kildare, Oklahoma. A cluster of tornadoes also occurred in central Wisconsin on that day, including an F2 tornado that hit near Ripon. The outbreak finished off on June 9, with nine weak tornadoes confirmed, primarily in Oklahoma, however, an F0 tornado killed one person in Caln, Pennsylvania that same day.

Overall, 107 tornadoes were confirmed over three days. At the time, it was the second largest June outbreak after the Mid–June 1992 tornado outbreak which occurred just under a year earlier.

June 21

Two F3 tornadoes occurred in eastern Iowa. The first one occurred near Manchester, while the second one occurred south of Dubuque about an hour later. No fatalities were reported.

June 29–30

An F3 tornado near Beaver Crossing, South Dakota kicked off the final tornado outbreak of the month. Multiple tornadoes were recorded in Iowa on June 29, with the strongest being an F2 tornado that occurred north of Pocahontas. 33 tornadoes occurred on June 30, with Ohio primarily affected. The second F3 tornado of the outbreak struck near Hillsboro, Ohio. 49 tornadoes were confirmed in total, and no fatalities were reported.

July
There were 242 tornadoes confirmed in the US in July. That set a new all-time record high for July, breaking the previous record high of 213 in 1992.

July 7–9

A widespread tornado outbreak took place over most of the Plains and Midwest states, dropping 51 tornadoes in three days. The strongest was an F3 tornado that hit Bethune, Colorado causing 8 significant injuries.

August
There were 112 tornadoes confirmed in the US in August.

August 6

A rare tornado outbreak occurred in the Southeastern United States on August 6. It was very rare in that most tornado outbreaks in this region occur in the spring. 22 tornadoes touched down, with one F4 killing four people and injuring over 200.

August 8–9

A small, but deadly tornado outbreak occurred over the Upper Midwest of the United States. An F0 tornado near Littlefork, Minnesota lifted and moved a mobile home, killing its two occupants. It is Minnesota's most recent single tornado to cause multiple deaths. Other minor tornadoes occurred in Minnesota, Iowa and Wisconsin, causing limited damage.

September
There were 65 tornadoes confirmed in the US in September.

October
There were 55 tornadoes confirmed in the US in October.

October 30
An F2 tornado killed three people in Lee County, Georgia.

November
There were 19 tornadoes confirmed in the US in November.

December
There were 6 tornadoes confirmed in the US in December.

See also
 Tornado
 Tornadoes by year
 Tornado records
 Tornado climatology
 Tornado myths
 List of tornado outbreaks
 List of F5 and EF5 tornadoes
 List of North American tornadoes and tornado outbreaks
 List of 21st-century Canadian tornadoes and tornado outbreaks
 List of European tornadoes and tornado outbreaks
 List of tornadoes and tornado outbreaks in Asia
 List of Southern Hemisphere tornadoes and tornado outbreaks
 List of tornadoes striking downtown areas
 Tornado intensity
 Fujita scale
 Enhanced Fujita scale

References

External links
 U.S. tornadoes in 1993 - Tornado History Project
 Tornado deaths monthly

 
1993 meteorology
Tornado-related lists by year
Torn